Jim Brown is a New Zealand banker who has been chief executive officer (CEO) of Sainsbury's Bank since 2019. He was formerly CEO of Ulster Bank from 2011 to 2015 and Williams & Glyn from 2015 to 2017.

Biography
Brown hails from New Zealand.

Brown worked for Citibank in Asia, Australia and New Zealand.

From 2005 to 2011, Brown was based in Hong Kong as CEO of Retail and Commercial Markets, Asia for RBS Asia.

From 2011 to 2015, Brown was CEO of Ulster Bank, succeeding Cormac McCarthy, who stood down. In April 2015 it was reported that Brown was the highest paid banker in Ireland, with his overall pay package at €1.63 million (£1.16M), up 66% from €979,000 a year earlier. Brown said his time as CEO was "hugely challenging". He was followed by Paul Stanley as acting CEO.

Brown was president of the Institute of Banking in Ireland.

From 2015 to 2017, Brown was CEO of Williams & Glyn, a division of the Royal Bank of Scotland. He replaced John Maltby in the role, who stood down.

On 11 June 2019, Sainsbury's announced Brown had been appointed CEO of Sainsbury's Bank. He became CEO designate on 19 June and worked alongside outgoing CEO Peter Griffiths for a short period of handover. In June 2019 he also became a member of the operating board of the Sainsbury's group.

References

Living people
New Zealand bankers
Year of birth missing (living people)